Florent Raimy (born 7 February 1986) is a French/Beninese entrepreneur. He formerly was an international  professional footballer who played as a midfielder. Following a back injury, he decided to retire from football to start a career in financial services. In 2022, he co-founded an international matchmaking agency, who specializes in helping elite true gentlemen find Love again. In honor of his late Mother, he names the company Edwige International.

International  football career
Raimy played in the 2005 FIFA World Youth Championship. He also got the bronze medal during the 2005 African Youth Championship.

Financial services
His passion for the financial sector drove him to several countries. From Switzerland to Mexico and Panama City he's helping top professionals make informed investment decisions.

International matchmaker
Florent Raimy is a French national and the brain behind Edwige International. For over a decade and across about 11 countries, he has acquired experience working with high-ranking professionals and upper-echelon executives; where he provides innovative, custom-tailored and cutting-edge solutions. He brings this wealth of experience on board to the matchmaking services of Edwige International. In delivering his service to the top professionals, he conscientiously seeks to distil and understand the peculiarities of each person and provides bespoke solutions. He understands the art of deducing exactly what a person wants and navigating through to provide a custom-built service that suits the person's needs.

Leveraging his professional dexterity to provide custom-made solutions, he is staunchly committed to making a difference in people's lives by helping them find compatible partners. He seeks to seamlessly connect people with partners that perfectly tick their respective boxes, and this motivated him to establish Edwige International.

Edwige International is a limited company based in Warsaw Poland.

Honours
Marsaxlokk
 Maltese First Division: 2009–10
 3rd 2005 African Youth Championship.

External links
 
 Florent Raimy at MaltaFootball.com

1986 births
Living people
Citizens of Benin through descent
Beninese footballers
French footballers
French sportspeople of Beninese descent
Benin international footballers
Association football midfielders
USL Second Division players
CS Sedan Ardennes players
R.E. Virton players
Cincinnati Kings players
FC Oberneuland players
FCM Bacău players
Marsaxlokk F.C. players
Mosta F.C. players
Expatriate soccer players in the United States
Expatriate footballers in Germany
Beninese expatriate sportspeople in Germany
Expatriate footballers in Romania
Beninese expatriate sportspeople in France
Expatriate footballers in Malta
Beninese expatriate footballers
Black French sportspeople